Harbecke is a locality in the municipality Schmallenberg in the district Hochsauerlandkreis in North Rhine-Westphalia, Germany.

The village has 123 inhabitants and lies in the west of the municipality of Schmallenberg at a height of around 395 m on the Kreisstraße 25. The river Harbecke flows through the village. 

Harbecke borders on the villages of Felbecke, Fleckenberg, Lenne, Selkentrop, Werpe and Werntrop. "Hartbeke" was first mentioned in 1361 in a document from Grafschaft Abbey. The village used to belong to the municipality of Wormbach in Amt Schmallenberg until the end of 1974.

Gallery

References

Villages in North Rhine-Westphalia
Schmallenberg